Hosny is a surname. Notable people with the surname include:

Ahmed Hosny (born 1991), Egyptian squash player
Ahmed Salah Hosny (born 1979), Egyptian footballer
Dina Hosny (born 1983), Egyptian sport shooter
Farouk Hosny (born 1938), Egyptian abstract painter
Hadia Hosny (born 1988), Egyptian badminton player 
Hassan Hosny (1931–2020), Egyptian actor
Hazem Hosny, Egyptian political scientist
Osama Hosny (born 1982), Egyptian footballer
Saad Hosny (born 1987), Egyptian footballer
Soad Hosny (1943–2001), Egyptian actress
Tamer Hosny (born 1977), Egyptian singer, actor, composer, director and songwriter